The Stadium Theatre Performing Arts Centre & Conservatory is a historic movie theater and concert venue and commercial building at 28 Monument Square in Woonsocket, Rhode Island.  The complex consists of two connected sections, one housing the theater, the other offices, both with retail spaces on the ground floor.  The theater was designed by Perry and Whipple of Providence and built in 1926.  

Initial funding came from Mrs. Norbert Champeau, a widow with interest in the theater, but the project was soon taken over by Arthur I. Darman, a local industrialist.  Although it lacked the opulence of theaters in larger cities, it was one of the most elaborately decorated performance spaces in Woonsocket.

The theatre's name comes from the "stadium" style of seating, which allowed everyone in the audience a good view of the stage.

History
The Stadium opened in 1926 as a vaudeville house. The declining theatre added to the National Register of Historic Places in 1976. 

The theatre showed x-rated movies in 1980s and closed in 1985. 

The building declined and decayed until Mayor Francis Lanctot started a campaign to save the building and raised over $3 million in donations. The renovated venue reopened in 2001. 

The film There's Something About Mary by the Farrelly Brothers premiered in the Stadium in 1998.

In 2014, Rhode Island voters approved a bond measure to set aside $2 million to renovate the four-story structure adjacent to the theatre, to be used as dedicated space for costuming, sets, props, and performing arts classes.

See also
National Register of Historic Places listings in Providence County, Rhode Island

References

Further reading
Statewide Historic Preservation Report for Woonsocket, Rhode Island published by the Rhode Island Historic Preservation Commission in September, 1976. 
Woonsocket, Rhode Island - A Centennial History 1888 - 1988 published by the Woonsocket Centennial Committee in 1988. 
Images of America - Woonsocket written by Robert R. Bellerose and published by Arcadia Publishing, Dover, NH, 1997.

External links
Stadium Theatre Web site
The history of the venue at Woonsocket.org

Cinemas and movie theaters in Rhode Island
Theatres in Rhode Island
Theatres on the National Register of Historic Places in Rhode Island
Buildings and structures in Woonsocket, Rhode Island
National Register of Historic Places in Providence County, Rhode Island
Theatres completed in 1926
Music venues completed in 1926
1926 establishments in Rhode Island
Public venues with a theatre organ